Lauriane Gilliéron (born 25 July 1984) is a Swiss actress, model and beauty pageant titleholder who was crowned Miss Switzerland 2005 on 21 September 2005 and represented Switzerland at Miss World 2005 in China but unplaced, she also competed at Miss Universe 2006 in United States where she placed 2nd runner-up.

Personal life
She was born in Lausanne and grew up in the village of Prilly where her father is mayor. Since the age of seven, Gilliéron has been a vegetarian and by 2017 she had become a vegan. She is the eldest of four children. She speaks French as well as some German, some Italian and some English.

Career

Gilliéron went to the Miss Universe 2006 pageant as one of the favorites. Her performance in the finals earned her a placement of 2nd runner-up at the beauty pageant, which took place in Los Angeles on 23 July 2006. It became Switzerland's best placement in this international event. The previous best record was a 3rd runner-up in 1983.

Gilliéron was second in the Swiss Latin Dance Championships in 2002 and 2003, and has represented Switzerland internationally in Latin Dance competitions. After her election as Miss Switzerland, Gilliéron competed in Miss World 2005 but did not place.

In 2009, she appeared in the episode "May Divorce Be With You" (season 3, episode 11) on Rules of Engagement.

Gilliéron has been the recurring female foil in the Nespresso commercials with George Clooney.

Television appearances

References

External links
 

1984 births
Miss Switzerland winners
Living people
Miss Universe 2006 contestants
Miss World 2005 delegates
Swiss female models
Swiss beauty pageant winners
People from Lausanne